Parvana Mirzaguliyeva (born 15 April 1988) is an Azerbaijani former footballer who played as a defender. She has been a member of the Azerbaijan women's national team since 2010.

References

1988 births
Living people
Women's association football defenders
Azerbaijani women's footballers
Azerbaijan women's international footballers